Aberdeen Corporation Tramways formerly served the City of Aberdeen, Scotland.

The system
The city's tram system was the most northerly municipal tramway in the United Kingdom. It started on 26 August 1898 when the Aberdeen Corporation purchased the assets of Aberdeen District Tramways. The council paid the purchase price of £84,735, representing £15 per share, and they also took over the temporary loans amounting to £10,000and the mortgages of £9,050. 

From 1906 to 1918 the system fell under the care of R. S, Pilcher who served as General Manager and Chief Engineer.

The system was electrified, with trams using the standard trolley poles until 1935 when bow collectors were fitted to take power from the overhead wires. The trams were double deck and painted in a dark green and cream livery, often with the words "CORPORATION TRANSPORT" painted prominently on the sides.

In the late 1930s the city purchased 18 trams from Nottingham Corporation Tramways, which closed in 1936. Further secondhand trams were later obtained from Manchester. The last new trams for the city were built by R Y Pickering of Wishaw in 1949.

The city's best known service was route 1, from Bridge of Don to Bridge of Dee, the numbering of which is preserved by the current number 1 bus service serving the same areas. The city's last tram operated on 3 May 1958, being replaced by diesel buses.

A short stretch of track that served as a terminus for the Sea Beach route remains alongside the Beach Boulevard where, following their final day in service, the entire fleet was burned. This remainder formerly ran right across to the former Constitution Street depot (now Aberdeen Science Centre), however the western end is now occupied by a hotel.

Routes

The tram system was supported by 14 bus routes numbered No. 4, No. 8 and No. 11 through to No. 22, No. 4 being an extension of the No. 4 tram route.

Depot
There was a tram depot at Queen's Cross (grid reference ). The building was purchased by Grampian Television in 1960 and converted into their television studios and headquarters. In 2003 Grampian Television relocated their studios and offices to new premises; the former tram depot was subsequently demolished and new flats built on the site.

Officials

General Managers

R. Stuart Pilcher 1906 - 1919 (formerly traffic manager for Burton upon Trent Corporation Tramways, afterwards general manager of Edinburgh Corporation Transport Department)
William Forbes 1919 - 1929 (assistant manager at Aberdeen from 1909, afterwards manager of the Cardiff Corporation Tramways)
James Lowe Gunn 1929 - 1934 (formerly general manager of the Greenock and Port Glasgow Tramway, afterwards general manager of Nottingham Corporation Tramways)
Alfred A. Smith 1934 - 1952
Frederick Y. Frazer 1953 - 1963

Traffic Superintendents

David Moonie 1898 - 1905 (from Aberdeen District Tramways)
James D. Caird 1905 - 1908 (afterwards superintendent of the Halifax Corporation Tramways)
Walter P. Young 1908 - 1912 (afterwards traffic superintendent of the Oldham Tramways)
William Forbes 1912 - 1918 (afterwards general manager)
Robert McLeod 1918 - 1919
Charles Symon 1927 - 1834
M.R. Shepherd 1934 - 1951
Alexander Main from 1951

Successors
Following the closure of the tram system, Aberdeen Corporation continued to operate buses. Following the Local Government (Scotland) Act 1973, the fleet passed to the new Grampian Regional Council in 1975, becoming Grampian Regional Transport. The dark green and cream livery was retained. Following the Transport Act 1985 the company was subsequently privatised, becoming the GRT Group, which later became FirstGroup. As of 2009, buses in Aberdeen are operated by First Aberdeen.

There were proposals for a new tramway system in 2013, but they were rejected in September 2014.

See also
History of Aberdeen
National Tramway Museum
Scottish Tramway and Transport Society
Aberdeen Suburban Tramways

References

External links
 Aberdeen Corporation Tramways at the British Tramway Company Badges and Buttons website.

History of Aberdeen
Transport in Aberdeen
Tram transport in Scotland
1958 disestablishments in Scotland